Herbert John Williams, Jr. (born 6 October 1940) is a Welsh former footballer who played at both professional and international levels as an inside forward.

Career
Born in Swansea, Williams spent his entire professional career with hometown club Swansea City, making 513 appearances in the English Football League between 1958 and 1975.

After leaving Swansea, Williams spent the 1975 season as player-coach of Australian side Balgownie Rangers.

He also earned three international caps for Wales, appearing in two FIFA World Cup qualifying matches.

References

1940 births
Living people
Welsh footballers
Wales international footballers
Wales under-23 international footballers
Swansea City A.F.C. players
English Football League players
Association football inside forwards